Štefan Kmeťo (born 26 December 1960) is a Slovak water polo player. He competed in the men's tournament at the 1992 Summer Olympics.

References

External links
 
 

1960 births
Living people
Slovak male water polo players
Olympic water polo players of Czechoslovakia
Water polo players at the 1992 Summer Olympics
Sportspeople from Topoľčany